Paolo Campinoti (born 17 October 1990) is an Italian footballer, who plays as a left midfielder for S.S.D. Massese.

Career
Born in Massa, Tuscany, Campinoti started his career at La Spezia, Liguria, about 30 km away. In 2005, he was signed by Internazionale and played for Inter from Allievi Regionali team to Allievi Nazionali team. In 2007–08 season, he was loaned to Spezia along with Alessio Lanotte. In August 2008 he left for Monza on loan along with Nicolò De Cesare, Giovanni Kyeremateng, Domenico Maiese, Davide Tremolada, Maximiliano Uggè, Andrea Mancini and Niccolò Scaccabarozzi.

Monza
After spent a season with Monza's Berretti team, Campinoti promoted to the first team in 2009. Monza bought him outright in August 2009 for free. He played various position for the club, likes as a left back against Tritium in 2010–11 Coppa Italia Lega Pro, or as left midfielder in 4312/433 formation and often as substitutes.

Honours
Monza youth
Campionato Nazionale Dante Berretti Runner-up: 2009

References

External links
 Monza Profile 
 Football.it Profile 
 

Italian footballers
Spezia Calcio players
Inter Milan players
A.C. Monza players
Association football midfielders
People from Massa
1990 births
Living people
Sportspeople from the Province of Massa-Carrara
Footballers from Tuscany